Zubayr Amiri (Dari: زبیر امیري; born 2 May 1990) is an Afghan professional footballer who plays for SC Hessen Dreieich and the Afghanistan national team. Amiri operates in midfield, and can also play in a more attacking role; considered a versatile player because he is proficient with both feet. He has previously played for Viktoria Aschaffenburg and Eintracht Frankfurt II.

Club career
Amiri was born in Kabul, Afghanistan. After playing youth football for 1.FC Langendiebach, TSV 1860 Hanau and Viktoria Aschaffenburg, he began his senior career at Viktoria Aschaffenburg in the 2009–10 season, in which the club competed in the Hessenliga. Amiri had a successful season, playing twenty-eight of Viktoria's thirty-six games and also scoring twice, but he left the club at the end of the season after they went into administration and were relegated, despite finishing in eighth place. As a result of this, Amiri transferred to Eintracht Frankfurt II for the 2010–11 season.

Amiri made his debut for Frankfurt in a 3–2 loss to Hessen Kassel on 1 September 2010. In the midfielder's first season at the club, Frankfurt finished sixth in the Regionalliga Süd. Amiri featured in twenty-four of Frankfurt's thirty matches, scoring one goal.
He also contributed eight assists, doubling the number of goals he created at Viktoria Aschaffenburg. His first goal for Frankfurt came in a 4–0 home win over 1860 Munich on 7 December 2010.

After being released by Eintracht Frankfurt, Amiri joined Regionalliga Süd club FC Bayern Alzenau in December 2011. He was given the number 11 shirt by the club. Later that month, Amiri helped Alzenau's under–23 side win the SV Heitzenröder-Silvestercup indoor football tournament. Amiri was the tournament's fourth–top scorer with 7 goals. The midfielder made his league debut for the club on 3 March 2012, coming on as a substitute for Patrick Armhein in a 3–1 defeat to Stuttgarter Kickers. He went on to make five more appearances for the side. Amiri's last league appearance for Alzenau came in a 1–0 win over his former club Eintracht Frankfurt II on 29 April 2012.

Amiri rejoined former club Viktoria Aschaffenburg on 1 July 2012, but had to wait until 25 July for his first league appearance of the 2012–13 season, coming on as a substitute for defender Fnan Tewelde in a 5–0 loss at SV Seligenporten. However, less than two months after signing for Aschaffenburg, Amiri's contract was cancelled by mutual agreement on 31 August 2012.

The midfielder signed for his former club, FC Bayern Alzenau, in September. Amiri had a successful spell at FC Bayern since rejoining the club, scoring five goals and assisting another eight goals in only 20 matches.

International career
Amiri was first included in the Afghanistan national team when he was called up to his country's 2011 AFC Challenge Cup squad. He was an unused substitute in the defeat to Nepal on 7 April and the 1–0 win over Sri Lanka two days later, but made his debut for Afghanistan on 11 April after coming on as a 62nd-minute substitute in the 2–0 loss to Korea DPR in the final group game. Amiri had to wait two months for his second international cap, playing in the first half of the 2–0 loss to Palestine on 29 June 2011 in a 2014 FIFA World Cup qualifier.

Personal life
Zubayr Amiri has two cousins who are also footballers, Germany international Nadiem Amiri and Nauwid Amiri.

Career statistics
Scores and results list Afghanistan's goal tally first, score column indicates score after each Amiri goal.

References

External links
 
 

Living people
1990 births
Afghan men's footballers
Afghanistan international footballers
German footballers
Afghan emigrants to Germany
Association football midfielders
Eintracht Frankfurt II players
Viktoria Aschaffenburg players
Footballers from Kabul
SC Hessen Dreieich players
Hessenliga players